Phyteuma sieberi, the horned rampion, is a species of herbaceous perennial plant in the family Campanulaceae. It is native to the South-eastern Alps, where it grows on limestone slopes. It was named after Franz Sieber, a 19th-century Bohemian botanist.

References

External links

Campanuloideae
Flora of Europe